Johnnie C. Crutchfield (born February 16, 1947) is an American politician from the U.S. state of Oklahoma. He served in the Oklahoma Senate from 1998 to 2010, representing District 14, which included Carter, Garvin, Love and Murray counties.

Early life
Born in Denton, Texas, Crutchfield earned a bachelor's degree from Southeastern State College in 1970 and a master's in education from Southeastern State College in 1975. He also attended the University of Oklahoma.

Crutchfield worked as a teacher for Ardmore Public Schools from 1970 to 1998.

Political career
Before served in the state legislature, Crutchfield served as a city councilman and mayor of Ardmore, Oklahoma. He served in the Oklahoma Senate from 1998 to 2010.

References

External links
 Senator Johnnie Crutchfield – District 14 official State Senate website
 Project Vote Smart – Johnnie Crutchfield (OK) profile
 Follow the Money – Johnnie Crutchfield
 2008 2006 campaign contributions

1947 births
Living people
Democratic Party Oklahoma state senators
People from Denton, Texas
21st-century American politicians